Łętownia may refer to the following places:
Łętownia, Leżajsk County in Subcarpathian Voivodeship (south-east Poland)
Łętownia, Przemyśl County in Subcarpathian Voivodeship (south-east Poland)
Łętownia, Strzyżów County in Subcarpathian Voivodeship (south-east Poland)
Łętownia, Lesser Poland Voivodeship (south Poland)